Ecuador
Mountains
Ecuador